Ganskiy is a lunar impact crater that is located on the far side of the Moon. It lies to the southeast of the walled plain Hirayama.

The rim of this crater is roughly circular, with a slight hexagonal appearance. There is some wear along the rim, particularly along the southwest where a pair of small craterlets lie next to the edge. The inner sides are unremarkable, and the interior floor is relatively level with a slight rise to the south of the midpoint. There is a tiny crater near the western inner wall.

This crater is sometimes listed as Ganskij, Hansky, or Hanskiy, but Ganskiy is the spelling recognized by the IAU.  The crater's name was approved in 1970.

Satellite craters
By convention these features are identified on lunar maps by placing the letter on the side of the crater midpoint that is closest to Ganskiy.

Ganskiy M crater was renamed 8 Homeward in October 2018.

References

External links
 LTO-82D2 Ganskij — L&PI topographic map
 :ru:Ганский, Алексей Павлович (Aleksey P. Ganskiy in Russian Wikipedia)

Impact craters on the Moon